Hazelle Goodman (born Hazel Goodman; February 16, 1959) is an actress from Trinidad and Tobago. As a child she was inspired to become an actress after viewing The Sound of Music, before her family moved to New York where she was raised in the boroughs of Queens and Brooklyn.

Career 

After graduating from City College of New York with a degree in drama, Goodman spent seven years developing her one-woman show called Hazelle! The show was adapted for the screen by HBO in 1995, and earned two Cable Ace nominations in the Best Comedy Special and Best Performer categories. In 1997, she became the first black actress to have a prominent role in a Woody Allen film when she portrayed Cookie, a prostitute in Allen's Deconstructing Harry. Goodman also had a recurring role on Homicide: Life on the Street as Georgia Rae Mahoney, a key figure in a drug dealing family who is eventually murdered. On stage, in addition to her one-woman show, she has also portrayed the Queen in Shakespeare's Cymbeline and took part in the February 10, 2001, staging of Eve Ensler's The Vagina Monologues at Madison Square Garden. Goodman went on to write and star in a second one-woman show called To the Top, Top, Top! She was also an original cast member of Spalding Gray: Stories Left to Tell, performing the late artists monologues that primarily dealt with adventure.

Filmography

Film

Television

References

External links 

1959 births
American film actresses
American stage actresses
American television actresses
City College of New York alumni
Living people
Actresses from New York City
Trinidad and Tobago film actresses
People from Brooklyn
People from Queens, New York
20th-century Trinidad and Tobago actresses
21st-century Trinidad and Tobago actresses
Trinidad and Tobago stage actresses
Trinidad and Tobago television actresses
21st-century American women
21st-century Trinidad and Tobago actors
20th-century Trinidad and Tobago actors